"Enclosed One Broken Heart" is a country music song written by Red Rowe, sung by Eddy Arnold, and released on the RCA Victor label. In July 1950, it reached No. 6 on the country juke box chart. It spent 12 weeks on the charts and was the No. 17 best selling country record of 1950.

See also
 Billboard Top Country & Western Records of 1950

References

Eddy Arnold songs
1950 songs